The Fateful Triangle: The United States, Israel and the Palestinians is a 1983 book by Noam Chomsky about the relationship between the US, Israel and the Palestinians.  Chomsky examines the origins of this relationship and its meaningful consequences for the Palestinians and other Arabs.  The book mainly concentrates on the 1982 Lebanon War and the "pro-Zionist bias" of most US media and intellectuals, as Chomsky puts it.

The book was updated in 1999 and contains three new chapters, drawing upon material from Z Magazine and other publications. New developments that have been incorporated include the First Intifada, Israeli invasion of Lebanon, and the ongoing peace process.

Edward Said, who also contributed the new foreword, said, "Chomsky's major claim is that Israel and the United States - especially the latter - are rejectionists opposed to peace, whereas the Arabs, including the PLO, for years have been trying to accommodate themselves to the reality of Israel."

External links
 Towards a New Cold War: Essays on the Current Crisis and How We Got There
 The Fateful Triangle: The United States, Israel and the Palestinians
 Turning the Tide: U.S. intervention in Central America and the Struggle for Peace
 After the Cataclysm: Postwar Indochina and the Reconstruction of Imperial Ideology
 After the Cataclysm: Postwar Indochina and the Reconstruction of Imperial Ideology
 The Washington Connection and Third World Fascism
 The Washington Connection and Third World Fascism
 American Power and the New Mandarins
 The Pentagon Papers. Senator Gravel ed. vol. V. Critical Essays. Boston
 Counter-Revolutionary Violence – Bloodbaths in Fact & Propaganda

Books by Noam Chomsky
Books about foreign relations of the United States
Books about the Arab–Israeli conflict
Books critical of Israel
1983 non-fiction books